Amara Malla (also known as Narendra Malla) was a king of the Malla dynasty and the third king of Kantipur. He succeeded his father Surya Malla and ruled from 1530 to 1560.

Life 
Amara Malla was a religious monarch and started numerous Jatras such as the Halchowk Devi Jatra, Hari Siddhi Jatra, Trisuli Jatra, etc.

During his reign, he annexed, in addition to others, the following villages:

 Harisiddhi
 Phaping
 Khokana
 Kirtipur
 Thankot
 Tokha
 Halchowk
 Gokarna

He died in 1560 and was succeeded by his son Mahendra Malla.

References

16th-century Nepalese people
Malla rulers of Kantipur
Year of birth unknown

Nepalese monarchs
1560 deaths